Sabourin is a French-Canadian surname most commonly found in Quebec, and may refer to:

Charles Sabourin, French pathologist
Dany Sabourin, Canadian goaltender with the National Hockey League (NHL)
Gabriel Sabourin, Canadian screenwriter 
Gary Sabourin, retired Canadian NHL player
Ken Sabourin, retired Canadian NHL player
Roméo Sabourin, Canadian World War II Lieutenant
Scott Sabourin, Canadian NHL player
Cathy Bursey-Sabourin, Canadian artist

French-language surnames